This is a list of castles in the Isle of Man.

See also
List of castles
Castles in Ireland
Castles in Scotland
Castles in Wales
Castles in Northern Ireland

References

 
Isle of Man
Castles
Isle of Man